The health care system in Hyderabad, India consists of 50 government hospitals, with bed facility of 5749, and the city has around 165 Private hospitals and up to 4000 clinics and Nursing Homes and 500 diagnostic centers, Total providing up to 12,000 bed spaces in general. The health scenario in Hyderabad is standardized and easily affordable than many other cities in India.

 The majority of residents prefer treatment at private health sector and the proportion of 28% of residents uses government facilities, due to far distance locations, poor quality of patient care and  extreme waiting time.

The city is home to the age old Osmania Medical College along with various private super specialty hospitals like Apollo Hospitals and Yashoda Hospitals among others 

The Indian Heart Association, is a non-profit NGO headquartered in Jubilee Hills, Hyderabad dedicated to raising cardiovascular health awareness among the South Asian population.

Hyderabad has a diverse population group with significant income inequality and extreme poverty. The government offers a social safety net in the form of Aarogyasri which provides free healthcare to qualified people.

Further reading
GROWTH OF THE HOSPITAL SYSTEM IN HYDERABADHISTORICAL AND DEMOGRAPHIC ASPECTS: 1880's-1950's, AIJAZ-UR-REHMAN

References

Healthcare in Hyderabad, India